Tre Avery (born February 26, 1997) is an American football cornerback for the Tennessee Titans of the National Football League (NFL). He played college football at Rutgers.

Early life and high school career
Avery grew up in Baltimore, Maryland and attended St. Francis Academy in Baltimore, Maryland, and Franklin High School.

College career
On May 3, 2015, Avery committed to play football at Ohio State, but transferred to Toledo after an eligibility issue at OSU, redshirting there before transferring a second time to Rutgers.

Professional career

On May 13, 2022, Avery signed with the Tennessee Titans as an undrafted free agent, and made the 53-man roster to start the regular season following final cuts.

References

https://www.youtube.com/watch?v=jv5WC_1nggo

External links
Rutgers Scarlet Knights Bio
Tennessee Titans Bio

Living people
1997 births
Rutgers Scarlet Knights football players
Players of American football from Baltimore
Tennessee Titans players